Tunbridge Wells is a constituency in Kent represented in the House of Commons of the UK Parliament since 2005 by Greg Clark, a Conservative who served as Secretary of State for Business, Energy and Industrial Strategy from 2016 to 2019 and then as Secretary of State for Levelling Up, Housing and Communities in 2022 as part of a caretaker government led by outgoing Prime Minister Boris Johnson.

Boundaries
1974–1983: The Borough of Royal Tunbridge Wells, the Urban District of Southborough, the Rural District of Cranbrook, in the Rural District of Tonbridge the parishes of Bidborough, Brenchley, Capel, Horsmonden, Lamberhurst, Paddock Wood, Pembury, Speldhurst.

1983–1997: The Borough of Tunbridge Wells. The constituency boundaries remained unchanged.

1997–2010: The Borough of Tunbridge Wells wards of Brenchley, Capel, Culverden, Goudhurst, Horsmonden, Lamberhurst, Paddock Wood, Pantiles, Park, Pembury, Rusthall, St James', St John's, St Mark's, Sherwood, Southborough East, Southborough North, Southborough West, Speldhurst and Bidborough.

2010–present: The Borough of Tunbridge Wells wards of Brenchley and Horsmonden, Broadwater, Capel, Culverden, Goudhurst and Lamberhurst, Hawkhurst and Sandhurst, Paddock Wood East, Paddock Wood West, Pantiles and St Mark's, Park, Pembury, Rusthall, St James', St John's, Sherwood, Southborough and High Brooms, Southborough North, Speldhurst and Bidborough.

The current constituency includes the large town of Tunbridge Wells, as well as most of its borough to the east which is generally rural.

History

The constituency was created in 1974, and was originally named "Royal Tunbridge Wells". Except for Cranbrook Rural District (previously part of the Ashford constituency) the area had formed part of the constituency of Tonbridge prior to 1974. In 1983 the "Royal" prefix was removed from the seat's name.

Political history
The seat's results since its 1974 creation indicate a Conservative safe seat. In 1994, the Conservative group on the council lost control, but regained it in 1998.

Prominent frontbenchers
In succession, from 1983 until 1997 Patrick Mayhew reached three leading positions: Solicitor General for England and Wales, Attorney General for England and Wales and for Northern Ireland (simultaneously) and Secretary of State for Northern Ireland.

From 2000 to 2001, Archie Norman was the Shadow Secretary of State for Environment, Transport and the Regions.

The present member, Greg Clark, was Minister for Decentralisation from the start of the Cameron ministry, and then two years later became Financial Secretary to the Treasury.

Constituency profile
The area is still largely rural in character and landscape, enjoying a gently elevated position which is traversed by the High Weald Landscape Trail. The area has local service sector and financial sector employers, light engineering combined with being substantially a commuter belt town for London, and to an extent, businesses on the southern side of the M25, such as in the Gatwick Diamond.

The electorate voted for Remain in the 2016 EU referendum, and are wealthier than the UK average.

Members of Parliament

Elections

Elections in the 2010s

Elections in the 2000s

Elections in the 1990s

Elections in the 1980s

Elections in the 1970s

See also
List of parliamentary constituencies in Kent

Notes

References

Politics of the Borough of Tunbridge Wells
Constituencies of the Parliament of the United Kingdom established in 1974
Parliamentary constituencies in Kent